The 2011 Tour of Oman is the second edition of the Tour of Oman cycling stage race. It is rated as a 2.1 event on the UCI Asia Tour, and held from 15 February to 20 February 2011, in Oman.

Teams
Sixteen teams will compete in the 2011 Tour of Oman. These will include ten UCI ProTour teams, five UCI Professional Continental teams, and one Continental team.
The teams participating in the race are:

An Post–Sean Kelly

Stages

Stage 1
15 February 2011 - Al Sawadi to Al Seeb,

Stage 2
16 February 2011 - The Wave, Muscat to Al Wutayya,

Stage 3
17 February 2011 - Sur to Sur,

Stage 4
18 February 2011 - Sultan to Jebel Al Akhdhar,

Stage 5
19 February 2011 - Al Jissah (ITT),

Stage 6
20 February 2011 - Qurayyat to Mattrah Seafront,

Classification Leadership

References

External links

2011
2011 in road cycling
2011 in Omani sport